Elinor Gwynn is a Welsh poet and environmentalist. She studied environmental law, and Gwynn's work is known for being heavily inflected by her love for the outdoors. According to the poet, personal tragedy also heavily inspired her work. In 2016, she won the Eisteddfod Crown for her poetry.

See also 
Catrin Dafydd

References 

Living people
Crowned bards
Welsh-language writers
Year of birth missing (living people)